The 2018 United States Senate election in Nebraska took place on November 6, 2018, to elect a member of the United States Senate to represent the state of Nebraska. Incumbent Republican Deb Fischer was re-elected to a second term against Lincoln city councilwoman Jane Raybould and Libertarian candidate Jim Schultz. The election comprises part of the 2018 U.S. Senate elections.

The candidate filing deadline was March 1, 2018, and the primary election was held on May 15, 2018.

Republican primary

Candidates

Nominated
 Deb Fischer, incumbent U.S. Senator

Eliminated in primary
 Jack Heidel, retired University of Nebraska at Omaha professor
 Dennis Frank Macek
 Jeffrey Lynn Stein
 Todd Watson, businessman and independent candidate for the U.S. Senate in 2014

Declined
 Shane Osborn, former State Treasurer and candidate for the U.S. Senate in 2014
 Don Stenberg, State Treasurer, former Attorney General, nominee for the U.S. Senate in 2000 and candidate in 1996, 2006 and 2012

Endorsements

Results

Democratic primary

Candidates

Nominated
 Jane Raybould, Lincoln City Councilwoman, former Lancaster County Commissioner and nominee for Lieutenant Governor in 2014

Eliminated in primary
 Chris Janicek, businessman
 Larry Marvin, perennial candidate
 Frank Svoboda

Endorsements

Results

Libertarian primary

Candidates

Declared
 Jim Schultz

Results

General election

Predictions

Debates

Polling

Results

By county 
From Secretary of State of Nebraska

Counties that flipped from Democratic to Republican
 Dakota (largest municipality: South Sioux City)
 Saline (largest municipality: Crete)
 Thurston (largest municipality: Pender)

References

External links
 Candidates at Vote Smart
 Candidates at Ballotpedia
 Campaign finance at FEC
 Campaign finance at OpenSecrets

Official campaign websites
 Deb Fischer (R) for Senate
 Jane Raybould (D) for Senate
 Jim Schultz (L) for Senate

2018
Nebraska
United States Senate